The Moses Hepburn Rowhouses are a set of four historic rowhouses located at 206 through 212 North Pitt Street between Cameron Street and Hammond Court in the Old Town area of Alexandria, Virginia. They were built about 1850 by Moses Hepburn Sr., a prominent African American businessman and citizen whose son became the first African American town councilor of West Chester, Pennsylvania, in 1882. The houses are two-story, two bay, side hall plan dwellings. Originally identical, the unit at No. 206 was updated in the late nineteenth century. Each house has had one-story or two-story additions in the rear.

The houses were added to the National Register of Historic Places in 2004.

References

External links

Houses on the National Register of Historic Places in Virginia
Houses in Alexandria, Virginia
National Register of Historic Places in Alexandria, Virginia
Houses completed in 1850